Maxim Smetanin (born 17 February 1974) is a retired Kyrgyzstani triple jumper. His personal best jump is 16.71 metres, achieved in July 2000 in Bishkek.

He won the silver medal at the 2000 Asian Championships. He also competed at the 1996 Olympic Games without reaching the final.

International competitions

References

External links
 

1974 births
Living people
Kyrgyzstani male triple jumpers
Athletes (track and field) at the 1996 Summer Olympics
Olympic athletes of Kyrgyzstan
Athletes (track and field) at the 1998 Asian Games
Asian Games competitors for Kyrgyzstan
Kyrgyzstani people of Russian descent